Jesse Martin may refer to:

 Jesse M. Martin (1877–1915), American politician
 Jesse B. Martin (1897–1974), Canadian bishop
 Jesse L. Martin (né Watkins; born 1969), American actor/singer
 Jesse Martin, (born 1981), German-Australian sailor